Lucasium steindachneri, commonly called the box-patterned gecko or Steindachner's gecko, is a species of nocturnal, medium-sized lizard in the family Diplodactylidae. The species has a pale strip with three patches of brown along its back. This gecko is terrestrial and only found in arid and semi-arid areas of continental Australia.

Etymology
The specific name, steindachneri, is in honor of Austrian herpetologist Franz Steindachner.

Description
It has large circular eyes with vertical pupils, and lacks moveable eyelids. Each eye is covered by a clear scale. To clean its eyes it wipes its tongue over these clear scales. The box-patterned gecko can be distinguished by a pale dorsal strip running from its eyes down to the base of the tail, containing three oval patches of dark brown colour. It has pale spots and flecks along its sides and a long slender tail, which makes up 70% of its total length. The underneath side of the body and the underneath sides of the limbs are whitish. The feet have five digits with circular discs and large singular terminal plates.

Feeding
The box-patterned gecko feeds on a varying array of arthropods such as insects, spiders and scorpions during the night.

Behaviour
When D. steindachneri is threatened or captured, it will make a barking or hissing sound, open its mouth, and jump towards the predator. If this does not scare the intruder off, it will drop its tail, distracting the predator, and allowing the gecko to escape.

Reproduction
A sexually mature female of D. steindachneri will lay one to two eggs during one year.

Geographic range and habitat
The box-patterned gecko is distributed across arid and semi-arid areas of Australia within Queensland, New South Wales, and a small patch of eastern South Australia and the Northern Territory. This is commonly dry open woodlands, forests, and mallee country with heavy or stony soils. During the day it shelters in crevices in the ground, and it is most often found in disused insect holes. At night it emerges from its hole to forage for food.

Taxonomy

References

Further reading
Boulenger GA (1885). Catalogue of the Lizards in the British Museum (Natural History). Second Edition. Volume I. Geckonidæ ... London: Trustees of the British Museum (Natural History). (Taylor and Francis, printers). xi + 436 pp. + Plates I-XXXII. (Diplodactylus steindachneri, new species, p. 102 + Plate VIII, figures 5, 5a).
Cogger HG (2014). Reptiles and Amphibians of Australia, Seventh Edition. Clayton, Victoria, Australia: CSIRO Publishing. xxx + 1,033 pp. .
Wilson, Steve; Swan, Gerry (2013). A Complete Guide to Reptiles of Australia, Fourth Edition. Sydney: New Holland Publishers. 522 pp. .

External links
Distribution of box-patterned gecko in Australia
Distribution of box-patterned gecko
Box-patterned gecko image
Box-patterned gecko image

Lucasium
Reptiles described in 1885
Taxa named by George Albert Boulenger
Geckos of Australia